18-j is a 2004 Argentine docudrama film. The motion picture is a collection of ten, ten-minute shorts, by ten Argentine directors. The film focuses on the July 18, 1994, bombing of the AMIA Building in Buenos Aires, where 86 people were killed and 300 others wounded. The perpetrators were never caught. AMIA is the Argentine Israelite Mutual Association, a charity, and the attack is considered the largest single incident of terrorism against Jews since World War II.

The film is a tribute to the memory of the victims from the Argentine cinema community, producers, and directors, and released on the ten-year anniversary of the attack. Each director portrays his or her memory and impressions of the event in their own way. The ten short films are shown in a sequence. The picture was co-produced by the INCAA (Instituto Nacional de Cine y Artes Audiovisuales) and ten of the most active Argentine producers. The film opens with a brief introduction by Argentine actor Norma Aleandro.

Background
Because the picture involved numerous explosions it was shot on an Argentine Army base. The short films capture Argentine life at several social levels, both Jewish and non-Jewish. The ten directors use a variety of cinematic styles: the sentimental, hard-hitting, and the abstract.

Distribution
The film opened in Argentina on August 19, 2004. In Brazil it opened October 4, 2004, at the Rio de Janeiro International Film Festival. The film has been screened at various film festivals, including: the Palm Beach Jewish Film Festival, Palm Beach, Florida; the Washington Jewish Film Festival, Washington, D.C.; the Haifa International Film Festival, Haifa, Israel; the San Francisco Jewish Film Festival, San Francisco; the Hong Kong Jewish Film Festival, Hong Kong; the Boston Jewish Film Festival, Boston; and others.

Production companies
Each of the following Argentine film production companies chose one director for the film:
 BD Cine (Daniel Burman)
 Audiovisual Production Center from the University of Tres de Febrero (Adrián Caetano)
 Cinetauro (Lucía Cedrón)
 Patagonik Film Group (Alejandro Doria)
 Zarlek Producciones (Alberto Lecchi)
 Kaos (Marcelo Schapces)
 Guacamole Films (Carlos Sorín)
 Aleph Media (Juan Bautista Stagnaro)
 Pol-Ka (Adrián Suar)
 Cinema Digital (Mauricio Wainrot)

Ten shorts

(1) 86
 Synopsis: The pain of the victims showing the effects of a bomb on objects: flowers, books, a birthday cake; as recalled by a blinded man.
 Directed by: Israel Adrián Caetano
 Written by: Roberto Gispert
 Editing: Israel Adrián Caetano
 Cinematography: Julián Apezteguia

(2) La Memoria
aka The Memory
 Synopsis: A minimalist homage of pain of the victims: headshots of the victims to the accompaniment of a Handel aria.
 Directed by: Carlos Sorín
 Written by:
 Editing: Alejandro Alem, Alejandro Parysow
 Cinematography: Hugo Colace

(3) Untitled
 Synopsis: Revolves around a delivery occurred in a Public Hospital on the same day of the attack in the Once neighborhood, where the attack took place.
 Directed by: Daniel Burman
 Written by: Daniel Burman
 Editing: Alejandro Brodersohn
 Cinematography: Alejandro Giuliani

(4) La Llamada
aka The Call
 Synopsis: Set in Quebrada de Humahuaca, a village far from Buenos Aires, a woman experiences anguish. Her son lives in Buenos Aires and she is desperately waiting to hear from him.
 Directed by: Alberto Lecchi
 Written by: Santiago Giralt
 Editing: Alejandro Alem
 Cinematography: Hugo Colace

(5) La vergüenza
aka Shame
 Synopsis: A survivor of the attack, Ana, revives her memories while preparing in her mind the testimony she will present in Court. Also covers the political cover-up following the bombing.
 Directed by: Alejandro Doria
 Written by: Alejandro Doria and Aída Bortnik
 Editing: Sergio Zóttola
 Cinematography: Willi Behnisch

(6) Mitzvah
 Synopsis: Centered on an elderly Jewish couple as they prepare for a bar mitzvah. Their daughter lives in Israel and they plan to visit her soon.
 Directed by: Lucía Cedrón
 Written by: Victoria Galardi
 Editing: Rosario Suárez
 Cinematography: José Luis García

(7) La comedia divina
aka The Divine Comedy
 Synopsis: The pain of the victims.
 Directed by: Juan Bautista Stagnaro
 Written by: Juan Bautista Stagnaro
 Editing: Alejandro Alem
 Cinematography: Andrés Mazzon

(8) Lacrimosa
aka The Tearful
 Synopsis: In purely artistic fashion four dancers from the San Martín Theater perform.
 Directed by: Mauricio Wainrot
 Written by: Carlos Gallardo and Mauricio Wainrot
 Editing: Marcela Sáenz
 Cinematography: Abel Peñalba

(9) La ira de Dios
aka The Wrath of God
 Synopsis: The pain of the victims.
 Directed by: Marcelo Schapces
 Written by: Paula Romero Levit and Pablo Fidalgo
 Editing: Miguel Schverdfinger
 Cinematography: José Guerra

(10) Sorprensa
aka Surprise
 Synopsis: The pain of the victims, and shows the arbitrariness of terrorism in selecting its victims.
 Directed by: Adrián Suar
 Written by: Josefina Trotta, Sebastián Noejovich, Lucía Victoria Roux, María Laura Meradi, Francisco Sánchez Azcárate, Damián Fraticelli and Mariano Vera
 Editing: Alejandro Alem, Alejandro Parysow
 Cinematography: Miguel Abal

Reception

Critical response
Jonathan Holland, film critic for Variety, liked the various stories and how they provide a "perceptive overview of Argentinian society". He wrote, "This worthy and affecting homage features styles from abstract to hard-hitting. Political fest sidebars are the pic's likeliest destination, along with arthouses in territories with a cultural interest in the tragedy... As a byproduct, pic reps an often perceptive overview of Argentine life at several social levels. Though many of the dead were Jewish, most helmers have significantly emphasized the universality of the tragedy rather than focusing on Jewish victimization."

References

External links
 
 18-j at the cinenacional.com 
 18-j  film review at Cineismo by Silvina Rival 
 

2004 films
2004 drama films
Argentine anthology films
Films directed by Israel Adrián Caetano
Argentine independent films
Political drama films
2000s Spanish-language films
Films directed by Carlos Sorín
Films set in Buenos Aires
Films shot in Buenos Aires
Argentine drama films
Films directed by Alejandro Doria
2000s Argentine films